Pittsboro Presbyterian Church is a historic Presbyterian church located on N. East Street in Pittsboro, Chatham County, North Carolina. It was built about 1850, and is a one-story brick church.  The tower and steeple were replaced in 1875 following a tornado, and again in the 1920s and in 1971.

It was listed on the National Register of Historic Places in 1978.

References

External links
Church website

Presbyterian churches in North Carolina
Churches on the National Register of Historic Places in North Carolina
Churches completed in 1850
19th-century Presbyterian church buildings in the United States
Churches in Chatham County, North Carolina
National Register of Historic Places in Chatham County, North Carolina
Pittsboro, North Carolina